A by-election was held for the New South Wales Legislative Assembly electorate of Clarence on 26 March 1955 following the death of Cecil Wingfield. All three candidates were endorsed by the Country Party

Dates

Results

Cecil Wingfield died.

See also
Electoral results for the district of Clarence
List of New South Wales state by-elections

References

1955 elections in Australia
New South Wales state by-elections
1950s in New South Wales